"Bristol Stomp" is a song written in 1961 by Kal Mann and Dave Appell, two executives with the Cameo-Parkway record label, for The Dovells, a doo-wop singing group from Philadelphia, Pennsylvania, who recorded it for Cameo-Parkway late that year. Appell also produced and arranged the track and his Cameo-Parkway's house band served as the studio musicians.

Background
The song was written about teenagers in 1961 who were dancing a new step called "The Stomp" at Good Will Hose Company dances in Bristol, Pennsylvania, a blue-collar suburb of Philadelphia. Before the Dovells' song, kids were dancing the Bristol Stomp to the song "Every Day of the Week" by The Students. The Dovells used the basic feel of that tune and put a three-beat emphasis on the syllables in the title: "Bristol Stomp".

The refrain:
"The kids in Bristol are sharp as a pistol
When they do the Bristol Stomp
Really somethin' when the joint is jumpin'
When they do the Bristol Stomp"

This song makes reference to the "Pony" and the "Twist".

Chart performance
The Dovells' recording made the #2 spot on the Billboard magazine Hot 100 singles chart in 1961 behind "Runaround Sue" by Dion.  "Bristol Stomp" sold over one million copies, and was awarded a gold disc.
"The Bristol Stomp" also peaked at #7 on the Hot R&B Sides chart.

Other versions
In 1962, under the Columbia record label, Chubby Checker released his rendition of "Bristol Stomp" on his album Don't Knock the Twist. Checker performs lead vocals with the Dovells providing backup. Though not as instrumentally polished as the Dovells' original, this take added more pep. The album title is the same name as the movie starring Checker.
On the live performance of Gary U.S. Bonds' "Seven Day Weekend" found on Johnny Thunders live soundtrack album Stations of the Cross, Walter Lure begins singing the chorus of "Bristol Stomp", playing on the fact that the two songs share the same chord sequence, although this chord sequence was common to many songs from the era.
UK group The Late Show's interpretation peaked at #40 on the official UK chart  in March 1979.

In popular culture
The song has been used by Fox Sports during broadcasts of the Food City 500, a NASCAR Sprint Cup Series race from the Bristol Motor Speedway, in Sullivan County, Tennessee. Massively wrecked race cars were referred to as having been "Bristol Stomped".
The song was featured in the season 14 Family Guy episode "A Lot Going On Upstairs". In one scene, Brian Griffin is first brought into Stewie Griffin's dream, where he is hosting a dinner party with Glenn Close. The Dovells suddenly appear singing the song, prompting Brian to ask how Stewie knows the song, to which Glenn answers that he heard it on a car radio once.

References

External links
Article on the Dovells that mentions the song
Interview with founding member Mark Stevens
More information about the song
Songwriter Kal Mann's obituary (mentions Bristol Stomp lyrics)
Full lyrics
Recording with lyrics
Original melody in The Students' Every Day of the Week

1961 songs
1961 singles
Songs with lyrics by Kal Mann
Songs written by Dave Appell
Cameo-Parkway Records singles
Songs about the United States
Bucks County, Pennsylvania